"Reaching Out / Tie Your Mother Down" is the debut single by rock band Queen + Paul Rodgers released in 2005 from the album Return of the Champions. It is medley of the 1996 Rock Therapy charity song "Reaching Out" with Queen's song "Tie Your Mother Down".

Track listing

Chart performance
In 2005, "Reaching Out" peaked at No. 33 on the Dutch Top 40 as a double A-side with "Tie Your Mother Down".

Credits
Bass – Danny Miranda
Drums – Roger Taylor 
Guitar – Jamie Moses 
Keyboards – Spike Edney 
Lead guitar – Brian May 
Vocals – Brian May, Paul Rodgers, Roger Taylor

Sampling
This song was sampled by American rapper Eminem in "Beautiful" from Eminem's sixth album Relapse (2009).

References

External links
 Lyrics at Queen official website

1996 songs
1996 singles
Charity singles
2005 debut singles
Queen + Paul Rodgers songs
Songs written by Andy Hill (composer)
Songs with lyrics by Don Black (lyricist)
Parlophone singles